Front Row Seat is the fourth studio album by country band Josh Abbott Band. It was released on November 6, 2015 via Pretty Damn Tough and Reviver. It peaked at number 9 on the Billboard Country Albums chart.

References

Josh Abbott Band albums
2015 albums